Troy Beebe (born January 5, 1962) is an American former professional auto racing driver. He competed in the NASCAR Busch Series from 1990 to 1997.

Racing career

Winston Cup Series
Beebe was born in Modesto, California. He made his debut in the premier NASCAR series in 1989, running one race at Sonoma in a car owned by his father. He put the No. 93 Taco Bell Buick into the field in 32nd. From there, he completed all but two laps en route to a 24th.

Beebe would run four races in the series in 1990, switching between his family-owned car and those owned by D.K. Ulrich. He could not top his '89 running, only managing a best finish of 30th at Sonoma. His other three finishes were 37th, 31st and 35th. However, he did record his best career start at Michigan, starting in the 28th slot.

Busch Series
Beebe moved his team to the Busch Series, where they ran 23 races in 1991. He made his debut in the No. 9 Taco Bell car at Richmond, where he put his car in the field in 31st. He would finish that race 24th. The very next race at Martinsville, Beebe managed an 11th place, and shortly afterwards, he earned his season-best qualifying effort of 4th at Hickory. Beebe was more consistent at the end of the year, topping off eleven top-20s in the year with his first career top-10, a 10th-place finish at IRP. It was the highlight of the year that ended with Beebe 22nd in points.

Beebe only managed fourteen starts in 1992, racing his No. 24 Banana Boat Ford. In those starts, Beebe struggled. His best finish of the year was a 15th at Daytona and his only other top-20 finishes were a pair of 16ths. This could largely be explained by seven DNFs, meaning he did not finish half his starts.

Beebe only managed eight more starts in 1993, once again with poor results. His best finish was a 17th place at Orange County. He failed to finish five races that season.

As a result, Beebe only attempted one race in 1994. He managed a 39th place start at Dover, and finished in 32nd after an engine change.

Beebe only ran two races in 1995, which would be the final time he would run a Busch race. He was 36th at Darlington and 43rd at Rockingham. He crashed out of both events and then moved to the Craftsman Truck Series.

Craftsman Truck Series
Beebe started the inaugural season in 1995, running the No. 10 Chevy at Phoenix, starting 24th and finishing 30th. He managed four more starts on the season in the No. 89 Chevy, recording a best finish of 12th at Saugus. His best start was also at Saugus, which was 13th.

Beebe's last start in any NASCAR series came in 1997, driving the No. 06 Farris Racing Chevy. Beebe started 24th, but only lasted two laps en route to a 39th-place finish at Las Vegas.

External links
 

1962 births
Living people
NASCAR drivers
ARCA Menards Series drivers
Sportspeople from Modesto, California
Racing drivers from California
Trans-Am Series drivers